Maximilianus Raguzzi (died 1639) was a Roman Catholic prelate who served as Bishop of Vulturara e Montecorvino (1637–1639).

Biography
On 17 August 1637, Maximilianus Raguzzi was appointed during the papacy of Pope Urban VIII as Bishop of Vulturara e Montecorvino. On 6 September 1637, he was consecrated bishop with Tommaso Carafa, Bishop of Vulturara e Montecorvino, serving as co-consecrator. He served as Bishop of Vulturara e Montecorvino until his death in 1639.

While bishop, he was the principal co-consecrator of Celestino Puccitelli, Bishop of Ravello e Scala (1637).

References

External links and additional sources 
 (for Chronology of Bishops) 
 (for Chronology of Bishops) 

Bishops appointed by Pope Urban VIII
1639 deaths
People from Ravello
17th-century Italian Roman Catholic bishops
1563 births